Kocaoba can refer to the following villages in Turkey:

 Kocaoba, Dikili
 Kocaoba, İvrindi